Yosef Heine is a retired Israeli footballer.

References

Living people
Israeli Jews
Israeli footballers
Hakoah Maccabi Ramat Gan F.C. players
Maccabi Netanya F.C. players
Association football forwards
Year of birth missing (living people)